Karin Brandes (born 26 September 1967) is a Peruvian former butterfly and medley swimmer. She competed in three events at the 1984 Summer Olympics.

References

External links
 

1967 births
Living people
Peruvian female butterfly swimmers
Peruvian female medley swimmers
Olympic swimmers of Peru
Swimmers at the 1984 Summer Olympics
Place of birth missing (living people)
20th-century Peruvian women
21st-century Peruvian women